Park Jung-hyun (born November 14, 2000), professionally known as Xiyeon, is a South Korean actress. A former child actress, singer and model, she trained under Pledis Entertainment for nine years before making her official debut as a member of the girl group Pristin in 2017. From April 2017 to January 2018, she hosted the South Korean music program Show! Music Core with Cha Eun-woo.

Early life

Xiyeon was born on November 14, 2000 in Anyang, South Korea. As a child, she appeared in several commercials for various companies and products, and most notably, a safety video for Korean Air. She also had small roles in a few dramas and the films, Father and Son: The Story of Mencius (2004) and The Cut (2007). She auditioned for Pledis Entertainment and trained for nine years under the company. As one of their trainees, she was featured in music videos of her label mates such as After School and Orange Caramel.

Career

2016–2019: Produce 101, debut with Pristin, and departure from Pledis

Under the name Park Si-yeon, she, along with six other female trainees of her company, joined the Mnet survival program Produce 101 which aimed to create an eleven-member girl group from a pool of 101 female trainees from various entertainment companies in South Korea that will promote for a year under YMC Entertainment. The show aired from January 22 to April 1, 2016. She failed to make the cut, ranking 25th in the tenth episode of the show.

While Nayoung and Kyulkyung were busy with I.O.I's promotions, Xiyeon and the four eliminated female trainees of Pledis Entertainment with the addition of Sungyeon, Yehana and Kyla, promoted under the pre-debut group Pledis Girlz which Nayoung and Kyulkyung were also a part of. On June 27, 2016, they released the single "We", which she co-wrote with three fellow members, along with an accompanying music video. Xiyeon also performed in weekly concerts with the group from May to September and were joined by Nayoung and Kyulkyung twice, with a final concert on January 6, 2017 just after I.O.I parted ways. During the concert, they announced their group name and eventually made their official debut on March 21, 2017 as a 10-member girl group Pristin by releasing their first EP Hi! Pristin with the lead single "Wee Woo". Xiyeon participated in the production of the album and one of the tracks "Over n Over" was penned by her and five other members.

On April 22, she became the host of the South Korean music program Show! Music Core with Astro member Cha Eun-woo. In August 2017, Pristin released their second extended play Schxxl Out with two songs co-composed by Xiyeon and three with lyrics co-written by her.

On May 24, 2019, Pristin was officially disbanded. Pledis Entertainment announced that Xiyeon would be departing from the label.

2020–present: Acting debut
In May 2020, Park announced through her Instagram account that she would continue her career as an actress and was working on an independent film, later titled as Dieter Fighter. Park signed with Soo Yeon Kang Entertainment in July 2020. In July 2021, Dieter Fighter was featured at the 25th Bucheon International Fantastic Film Festival, where Park won the Fantastic Actor Jury's Special Mention Award for her performance.

Discography

Filmography

Film

Television series

Web series

References 

2000 births
Living people
People from Anyang, Gyeonggi
21st-century South Korean actresses
Pledis Entertainment artists
Pristin members
Produce 101 contestants
South Korean dance musicians
South Korean child actresses
South Korean child singers
South Korean female idols
South Korean female models
South Korean women pop singers
21st-century South Korean singers
21st-century South Korean women singers
School of Performing Arts Seoul alumni